The F2 Logistics Cargo Movers is a professional women's volleyball club in the Premier Volleyball League (PVL). The team is owned by Efren E. Uy (Chairman, President, and CEO) of F2 Logistics Philippines, Inc.

Background
The F2 Logistics Cargo Movers was formed by F2 Logistics Philippines Inc. It debuted in the Philippine Superliga (PSL) in 2016.

On March 11, 2021, the team announced it has joined the professional Premier Volleyball League (PVL), following the exodus of other PSL teams to the PVL. On July 9, 2021, the team announced that it will not participate in the Open Conference citing injuries and lack of training due to difficulties maintaining their training bubble. The team would not have any competitive games from March 2020 until November 2021, when they took part and win the inaugural 2021 PNVF Champions League.

Current roster
For the 2023 Premier Volleyball League All-Filipino Conference

C: Team Captain
I: Import
DP: Draft Pick
R: Rookie
IN: Inactive
S: Suspended
W: Withdrew
 Injured

Previous roster
For the 2022 Premier Volleyball League Reinforced Conference

C: Team Captain
I: Import
DP: Draft Pick
R: Rookie
IN: Inactive
S: Suspended
W: Withdrew
 Injured

For the 2022 Premier Volleyball League Open Conference

C: Team Captain
I: Import
DP: Draft Pick
R: Rookie
IN: Inactive
S: Suspended
W: Withdrew
 Injured

Head coach
   Ramil de Jesús 
Assistant Coach(es)
 
 
Team manager
 

Physical Therapist
 

C: Team Captain
I: Import
DP: Draft Pick
R: Rookie
IN: Inactive
S: Suspended
W: Withdrew
 Injured

Head coach
   Ramil de Jesús 
Assistant Coach(es)
 
 
Team manager
 

Physical Therapist
 

C: Team Captain
I: Import
DP: Draft Pick
R: Rookie
IN: Inactive
S: Suspended
W: Withdrew
 Injured

Head coach
   Ramil de Jesús 
Assistant Coach(es)
 
 
Team manager
 

Physical Therapist
 

C: Team Captain
I: Import
DP: Draft Pick
R: Rookie
IN: Inactive
S: Suspended
W: Withdrew
 Injured

Head coach
  Arnold Laniog
Assistant Coach(es)
 
 
Team manager
 

Physical Therapist
 

C: Team Captain
I: Import
DP: Draft Pick
R: Rookie
IN: Inactive
S: Suspended
W: Withdrew
 Injured

Head coach
  Ramil de Jesús
Assistant Coach(es)
 
 
Team manager
 

Physical Therapist
 

C: Team Captain
I: Import
DP: Draft Pick
R: Rookie
IN: Inactive
S: Suspended
W: Withdrew
 Injured

Head coach
  Ramil de Jesús
Assistant Coach(es)
 
 
Team manager
 

Physical Therapist
 

C: Team Captain
I: Import
DP: Draft Pick
R: Rookie
IN: Inactive
S: Suspended
W: Withdrew
 Injured

Head coach
  Ramil de Jesús
Assistant Coach(es)
 
 
Team manager
 

Physical Therapist
 

C: Team Captain
I: Import
DP: Draft Pick
R: Rookie
IN: Inactive
S: Suspended
W: Withdrew
 Injured

Honors

Team

Philippine Super Liga

PNVF Champions League

Premier Volleyball League

Individual

Beach volleyball

Imports

Team captains 
  Charleen Cruz-Behag (2016 - 2019)
  Abigail Maraño (2019, 2021, 2022, 2023 - present)
  Lindsay Stalzer (2020, 2022)

Notable players

Domestic players

Mary Joy Baron
Desiree Cheng
Charlene Cruz
Kim Kianna Dy
Kim Fajardo
Victonara Galang
Dawn Macandili
Abigail Maraño
Kalei Mau
Ernestine Tiamzon

Players written in italic still play for the club.

Coaches
Rose Molit-Prochina (2016)
Ramil de Jesus (2016–2021)
Benson Bocboc (2022)
Regine Diego (2023–)

References

Women's volleyball teams in the Philippines
Philippine Super Liga
Premier Volleyball League (Philippines)
2016 establishments in the Philippines
Volleyball clubs established in 2016